Boleslav or Bolesław may refer to:

In people:
 Boleslaw (given name)

In geography:
Bolesław, Dąbrowa County, Lesser Poland Voivodeship, Poland
Bolesław, Olkusz County, Lesser Poland Voivodeship, Poland
Bolesław, Silesian Voivodeship, Poland
Brandýs nad Labem-Stará Boleslav, Czech Republic
Mladá Boleslav, Czech Republic

See also
 Pulß
 Václav (disambiguation)
 Wenceslaus (disambiguation)

de:Bolesław